The Germany national football team played its first international match on 5 April 1908 during the era of the German Empire, losing 5–3 to Switzerland in Basel. The team has been one of the most successful national sides in world football. They won the World Cup in 1954, 1974, 1990 and 2014, as well as the European Championship in 1972, 1980 and 1996. In total, 951 players have represented the Germany national team. This list covers players with between one and four caps for the national team organised by the German Football Association, including West Germany. The player are listed in alphabetical order of surname. All statistics are correct up to and including the match played on 13 October 2020 against Switzerland.

Key

Players

See also
List of Germany international footballers
List of Germany international footballers (5–19 caps)
List of Germany international footballers born outside Germany
List of East Germany international footballers
List of Saarland international footballers

References

General references

External links
Player list from DFB 
All-time appearances at WorldFootball.net
Germany national team caps at EU-Football.info

 2
Association football player non-biographical articles